Juan José Haedo (born 26 January 1981) is an Argentine former professional road racing cyclist and track cyclist, who rode professionally between 2003 and 2014. He is the brother of Lucas Sebastián Haedo.

Haedo started his career on the track before turning professional on the road in 2003 with Colavita-Bolla. After a year in the United States with the Toyota - United Pro Cycling Team he joined  in 2007. Haedo had a successful career with CSC picking up notable stage wins in the Tour of California, Critérium du Dauphiné, Tirreno Adriatico and Vuelta a España. In 2010 he was granted the Konex Award Merit Diploma as one of the five best cyclist of the last decade in Argentina. He competed with the team until the end of 2012, when he joined . After retiring he stayed with the team as an assistant director.

Major results

Road

2005
 1st Bank of America Invitational Criterium
 Redlands Classic
1st Stages 2 & 3
 1st Stage 2 Fitchburg Longsjo Classic
 1st Stage 6 International Cycling Classic
 1st Stage 4 International Tour de 'Toona
2006
 1st Tour of Somerville
 1st Sunny King Criterium
 Tour of California
1st Stages 1 & 4
 1st Stage 6 Tour de Georgia
 1st Stage 3 San Dimas Stage Race
 1st Stage 3 Redlands Classic
 1st Stage 5 Cascade Cycling Classic
 1st Stage 4 International Tour de 'Toona
 2nd Wachovia Series Lancaster Classic
 4th Wachovia Series Philadelphia International Championship
2007
 1st Rund um Köln
 1st Colliers Classic
 1st Commerce Bank International Championship
 Tour of California
1st  Points classification
1st Stages 2 & 6
 Tour de Georgia
1st  Points classification
1st Stage 7
2008
 1st Clásica de Almería
 Tour de San Luis
1st Stages 1 & 5
 1st Stage 1 Tour of California
 1st Stage 3 Vuelta a Murcia
 1st Stage 6 Danmark Rundt
 1st Stage 2 Tour de Georgia
 1st Stage 2 Tour de Luxembourg
 6th Münsterland Giro
2009
 1st Cholet-Pays de la Loire
 1st Stage 2 Tour de Wallonie
 1st Stage 7 Tour de San Luis
 1st Stage 4 Tour of Missouri
 2nd Paris–Bourges
 4th Overall Circuit Franco-Belge
1st Stage 4
2010
 1st Rund um Köln
 1st Mumbai Cyclothon
 1st Stage 7 Volta a Catalunya
 1st Stage 2 Critérium du Dauphiné
2011
 1st Stage 16 Vuelta a España
 1st Stage 3 Tirreno–Adriatico
 1st Stage 2 Ster ZLM Toer
2012
 1st Grand Prix de Denain
2014
 1st Stage 3 Grand Prix Cycliste de Saguenay

Track

  Junior National Champion (1998/1999)
  Senior National Champion (2000/2001)
  Olympic Sprint, Pan American Games, Canada (1999)
  Olympic Sprint, Pan American Jr. Championships, Argentina (1999)
  Sprint, Pan American Jr. Championships, Argentina (1999)
  1 km, Pan American Jr. Championships, Argentina (1999)
  Keirin, Pan American Sr. Championships, Colombia (2000)

References

External links

1981 births
Living people
People from Chascomús
Argentine male cyclists
Argentine Vuelta a España stage winners
Cyclists at the 2008 Summer Olympics
Olympic cyclists of Argentina
Pan American Games medalists in cycling
Pan American Games bronze medalists for Argentina
Cyclists at the 1999 Pan American Games
Medalists at the 1999 Pan American Games
Sportspeople from Buenos Aires Province